The Boeing 747-400 Large Cargo Freighter (LCF) is a wide-body cargo aircraft modified extensively from the Boeing 747-400 airliner. With a volume of  it can hold three times that of a 747-400F freighter. The outsized aircraft, known as the Dreamlifter, was designed to transport Boeing 787 Dreamliner parts between Italy, Japan, and the U.S., but has also flown medical supplies during the COVID-19 pandemic.

Development 

Boeing Commercial Airplanes announced on October 13, 2003, that, due to the length of time required by land and marine shipping, air transport would be the primary method of transporting parts for the assembly of the Boeing 787 Dreamliner (then known as the 7E7). Boeing 787 parts were deemed too large for standard marine shipping containers as well as the Boeing 747-400F, Antonov An-124 and An-225. Initially, three used passenger 747-400 aircraft were to be converted into an outsize configuration in order to ferry sub-assemblies from Japan and Italy to North Charleston, South Carolina, and then to Washington state for final assembly, but a fourth was subsequently added to the program. The Large Cargo Freighter has a bulging fuselage similar in concept to the Super Guppy and the Airbus Beluga and BelugaXL outsize cargo aircraft, which are also used for transporting wings and fuselage sections.

The LCF conversion was partially designed by Boeing's Moscow bureau and Boeing Rocketdyne with the swing tail designed in partnership with Gamesa Aeronáutica of Spain. The cargo portion of the aircraft is unpressurized. Unlike the hydraulically supported nose section on a 747 Freighter, the tail is opened and closed by a modified shipping container handling truck, and locked to the rear fuselage with 21 electronic actuators.

Modifications were carried out in Taiwan by Evergreen Aviation Technologies Corporation, a joint venture of Evergreen Group's EVA Air and General Electric. Boeing reacquired the four 747-400s; one former Air China aircraft, two former China Airlines aircraft, and one former Malaysia Airlines aircraft.

The first 747 Large Cargo Freighter (LCF) was rolled out of the hangar at Taipei Taoyuan International Airport on August 17, 2006. It successfully completed its first test flight on September 9, 2006, from this airport.

The 787 Dreamliner parts are placed in the aircraft by the DBL-100 cargo loader, the world's longest cargo loader. In June 2006, the first DBL-100 cargo loader was completed.

The 747 LCF's unusual appearance has drawn comparisons to the Oscar Mayer Wienermobile and the Hughes H-4 Hercules ("Spruce Goose"). Due to its ungainly form—exacerbated in that the first airplane remained unpainted for some time, due to the need for immediate testing—Boeing Commercial Airplanes president Scott Carson jokingly apologized to 747 designer Joe Sutter that he was "sorry for what we did to your plane."

Operational history

Flight testing 
On September 16, 2006, N747BC arrived at Boeing Field, Seattle to complete the flight test program. Swing-tail testing was done at the Boeing factory in Everett. The second airplane, N780BA, made its inaugural test flight on February 16, 2007. The third began modification in 2007. The first two LCFs entered service in 2007 to support the final assembly of the first 787s.

Delivery times for the 787's wings, built in Japan, was reduced from around 30 days to just over eight hours with the Dreamlifter. Evergreen International Airlines (unrelated to EVA Air or EGAT), a U.S. air freight operator based in McMinnville, Oregon, operated the LCF fleet until August 2010. Then Atlas Air, which was awarded a nine-year contract for the operation of the aircraft in March 2010, took over LCF operation. Evergreen had achieved a 93% on flight schedule performance with the LCF, and sued Boeing for $175 million, which the court mostly dismissed.

Into service 
In December 2006, Boeing announced the 747 LCF would be named Dreamlifter, a reference to the 787's name, Dreamliner. It unveiled a standard livery for the aircraft that included a logo reminiscent of the 787's Dreamliner logo.

Certification was initially planned for early 2007, but was pushed back to June 2007. The aircraft's winglets were removed to resolve excess vibration and other handling characteristics prior to final certification. In the meantime, as part of the flight test program, LCF delivered major sections of the 787 from partner sites around the world to the Boeing factory in Everett, Washington for final assembly. The 747 LCF was granted FAA type certification on June 2, 2007. From its first flight in 2006 until certification in 2007, the Dreamlifter completed 437 hours of flight testing along with 639 hours of ground testing.

Of the four 747 Dreamlifters Boeing acquired, three were complete and operational by June 2008, and the fourth became operational in February 2010.

On July 1, 2020, a Dreamlifter arrived at Salt Lake City International Airport, carrying 500,000 face masks to be used by Utah school children and teachers as part of the state's response to the COVID-19 pandemic. The flight was a joint effort between Boeing, Atlas Air, H.M. Cole, Cotopaxi, Flexport, UPS and the state of Utah.

Incidents 
On November 20, 2013, Dreamlifter N780BA operated by Atlas Air inadvertently landed at Colonel James Jabara Airport, a small general aviation airport in Wichita, Kansas. Its intended destination was McConnell Air Force Base, 9 miles (14 km) past Jabara Airport on the same heading. The aircraft was able to successfully take off again from Jabara's  runway the following day and landed at McConnell without incident.

On October 11, 2022, Dreamlifter N718BA operated by Atlas Air lost a wheel from its main landing gear while taking off from Taranto, Italy. The wheel bounced outside the airport perimeter and ended up in a vineyard. The plane continued on to Charleston, South Carolina and made a safe landing.

Specifications 

Sources: Boeing 747-400 specifications, Boeing 747 Airport Report, 747 LCF fact sheet

See also

References 
Notes

Bibliography

External links 

 Boeing fact sheet

2000s United States cargo aircraft
Aircraft first flown in 2006
Boeing 747
Quadjets